The Wedding Pact is a 2014 American romance film directed by Matt Berman and starring Haylie Duff and Chris Soldevilla.

The film was released on DVD on February 3, 2014. A sequel, The Baby Pact, premiered in 2021.

Plot
Mitch and Elizabeth get to know and befriend each other in college. Mitch falls in love with Elizabeth, but decides not to tell her. After college, Elizabeth throws a phrase that if after 10 years neither of them finds a partner in life, they will marry. After ten years, Mitch hasn't gotten married and discovers that Elizabeth hasn't either. Still remembering their promise, Mitch makes a cross country journey to visit Elizabeth.

Cast
 Haylie Duff as Elizabeth Carter
 Chris Soldevilla as Mitch 
 Angie Everhart as Laura

References

External links 
 
 

2014 romance films
American romance films
Films about weddings
2014 films
2010s English-language films
2010s American films